The 1965–66 Bulgarian Cup was the 26th season of the Bulgarian Cup (in this period the tournament was named Cup of the Soviet Army). Slavia Sofia won the competition, beating CSKA Sofia 1–0 in the final at the Vasil Levski National Stadium.

First round

!colspan=3 style="background-color:#D0F0C0;" |25 December 1965

|-
!colspan=3 style="background-color:#D0F0C0;" |26 December 1965

|}

1Dorostol qualified by drawing lots.

Second round

!colspan=3 style="background-color:#D0F0C0;" |26 June 1966

|}

Quarter-finals

|-
!colspan=3 style="background-color:#D0F0C0;" |13 August 1966

|-
!colspan=3 style="background-color:#D0F0C0;" |14 August 1966

|-
!colspan=3 style="background-color:#D0F0C0;" |17 August 1966

|}

Semi-finals

|-
!colspan=3 style="background-color:#D0F0C0;" |25 August 1966

|}

Final

Details

References

1965-66
1965–66 domestic association football cups
Cup